Pustularia globulus is a species of sea snail, a cowry, a marine gastropod mollusk in the family Cypraeidae, the cowries.

Subspecies  
 Pustularia globulus brevirostris Schilder & Schilder, 1938
 Pustularia globulus globulus (Linnaeus, 1758)
 Pustularia globulus sphaeridium Schilder & Schilder, 1938
Pustularia globulus marerubra Lorenz, 2009: synonym of Pustularia marerubra Lorenz, 2009 (original rank)

Description

Distribution
This species is distributed in the Red Sea and in the Indian Ocean along Aldabra, Chagos, Kenya, Madagascar, the Mascarene Basin, Mauritius, Réunion, the Seychelles, and Tanzania.

References

 Verdcourt, B. (1954). The cowries of the East African Coast (Kenya, Tanganyika, Zanzibar and Pemba). Journal of the East Africa Natural History Society 22(4) 96: 129-144, 17 pls

External links

Cypraeidae
Gastropods described in 1758
Taxa named by Carl Linnaeus